The Sea Turtle Conservancy (STC), formerly known as Caribbean Conservation Corporation, is an American not-for-profit 501(c)(3) membership organization based in Gainesville, Florida. STC was incorporated, based on an earlier informal organization known as The Brotherhood of the Green Turtle, in 1959 by Joshua B. Powers in response to renowned ecologist Dr. Archie Carr's award-winning book, The Windward Road, which first alerted the world to the plight of sea turtles. Carr served as Scientific Director of STC from 1959 until his death in 1987. Since its founding, STC's research and conservation initiatives have been instrumental in saving the Caribbean green sea turtle from immediate extinction, as well as raising awareness and protection for sea turtles across the globe with 50 years of experience in national and international sea turtle conservation, research and educational endeavors. The organization began its work in Costa Rica, but has expanded its research and conservation efforts throughout Central America and the wider Caribbean.

Habitat Preservation & Advocacy 
STC works to enact protective laws and establish refuges for the preservation of sea turtle habitats and coastal environments. The organization was instrumental in creating the Tortuguero National Park in Costa Rica. In the United States, STC worked with other groups and agencies to establish the Archie Carr National Wildlife Refuge in Melbourne, Florida and continues to lobby Congress and government agencies to purchase the lands necessary to complete the refuge. STC's international efforts include advocating for sea turtles at the United Nations Convention on International Trade in Endangered Species, and protecting one of the most important sea turtle nesting beaches in the world by helping prevent off-shore oil-drilling in Costa Rica.

Tortuguero 
STC continues the work of Dr. Archie Carr every year on the 35 km black sand beach of Tortuguero, Costa Rica, the nesting site of more endangered green sea turtles than anywhere else in the Western Hemisphere. For more than 40 years, this monitoring program has provided much information on the reproductive ecology and migratory habits of sea turtles. Researchers, who are based at STC's John H. Phipps Biological Field Station, continue to monitor nesting trends, growth rates and reproductive success.

STC also supports a bird banding and monitoring project that was begun in Tortuguero in 1991 as part of the "Partners in Flight" program, in association with Costa Rican and North American ornithologists. Resident and neotropical migrant bird species are surveyed in natural and disturbed habitats of the area and vital statistics are collected. The project also seeks to train Latin American wildlife biologists in ornithological field techniques.

Chiriquí Beach 
In 2003, STC began working to protect and restore the once globally significant hawksbill sea turtle nesting population at Chiriquí Beach, Panama. The program consists of intensive monitoring of hawksbill and leatherback sea turtle nesting activity, protection of nesting females and their nests, and public education in the region.

Other research 
STC has supported hundreds of research projects on the biology and conservation of sea turtles around the world. Recent studies have focused on impacts of tourism on nesting beaches, the levels of turtle harvesting at feeding grounds, satellite tracking of turtles, and monitoring of juvenile turtles around Bermuda.

Education and training 
STC works with coastal residents, businesses, conservationists and governments to increase awareness of the threats facing sea turtles, including coastal development, pollution, poaching and accidental capture in nets. STSL developed an educational program that uses the internet to allow school children and others around the world to learn about sea turtles as they follow the movements of turtles being tracked by satellite. More than 500,000 children around the world have been reached by this program already.

In Tortuguero, Costa Rica, STC operates the H. Clay Frick Natural History Visitor Center to inform the more than 40,000 people who visit every year about the importance of the region's habitats to the survival of sea turtles, manatees and other tropical wildlife.

The STC is also a partner in a new environmental education center at the heart of Eastern Florida's Archie Carr National Wildlife Refuge.

STC provides training in the management and stewardship of sea turtles and coastal ecosystems. Graduates of previous training programs now lead conservation efforts in over 25 countries around the world.

See also 
The Windward Road
Turtle walk
Tour de Turtles

References

External links 
 Sea Turtle Conservancy Website

Nature conservation organizations based in the United States
Organisations based in the Caribbean
Sea turtles
Environmental organizations based in Florida
1959 establishments in Florida
Organizations established in 1959
Turtle conservation organizations